Pauk Township is a township of Pakokku District in Magway Division of Burma (Myanmar). The principal town and administrative seat is Pauk.

The township lies between 21° 10' and 21° 49' north latitude and 94° 18' and 94° 44' east longitude. It has an area of 1,490 sq.mi.  The principal river is the Kyaw River along the banks of which rice is grown.

The Burmese government has denied that chemical weapons are produced at the military facility there.

Borders
Pauk Township is bordered by:
 Seikphyu Township, to the south,
 Saw Township, to the west,
 Tilin Township, to the northwest,
 Gangaw Township and Pale Township of Sagaing Division, to the north,
 Myaing Township, to the east, and
 Pakokku Township, to the southeast.

Notes

External links
"Pauk Google Satellite Map" map of administrative area with listing of principal settlements, from Maplandia
"Map of Pauk Township"

Townships of Magway Region